WWE Day of Reckoning is a professional wrestling video game released for the GameCube console in 2004. The game is based on World Wrestling Entertainment and many of the wrestlers who were on the WWE roster at the time of release were included as player characters. The game also features the option to create wrestlers.

The game's single player mode involves the player guiding a created wrestler through the ranks as a rookie and into main event stardom on either of WWE's brands Raw or SmackDown!.

Gameplay 
The game features a control system similar to that of AKI's Nintendo 64 wrestling games with weak/strong grappling attacks and strikes. Players are also able to counter their opponents' attacks with a timed button press. One of the game's unique features is the "Momentum Shift" move - a desperation attack that gives a character an instant advantage during the match. The game's Exhibition mode allows players to wrestle in various match types including Hell in the Cell and Iron Man matches. The game's Story Mode allows players to take a created wrestler from WWE developmental to main event status by achieving various goals during matches.

Plot 
The player creates a new WWE developmental superstar and assumes their role for the game. The created superstar starts off as a new wrestler signed to a WWE contract attempting to work his way up to the main roster. After this series of matches and cutscenes, the superstar is allowed to perform on Sunday Night Heat, before he finally is allowed to join the main roster. There are two different brands to choose from (Raw or SmackDown!), each with their own distinct roster of wrestlers. As an effect, this will also choose which stable they will join. Choosing Raw results in joining Triple H's Evolution. Choosing SmackDown! results in joining The Undertaker's New Ministry.

The superstar goes on and works his way up the "rungs of the ladder" in a series of matches, ultimately resulting in the acquisition of the show's World Championship. If the player has chosen Raw, the World Heavyweight Championship will be awarded. If SmackDown! was chosen, the WWE Championship will be awarded.

As the story progresses, Triple H or The Undertaker starts kicking people off the team as they fail him or (as in the case of the created superstar) become a threat to his championship. The final battle is an Iron Man match at WrestleMania XX for the championship.

The story is continued in the sequel, WWE Day of Reckoning 2, though under the assumption that the superstar chose Raw.

Reception

GameSpot's Alex Navarro lauded the game for its improved story mode and graphics compared to the WWE's previous GameCube game WWE WrestleMania XIX,  as did IGN's Matt Casamassina. However, both sites found fault with the game's limited selection of wrestlers.  The game itself received "favorable" reviews according to video game review aggregator Metacritic.  In Japan, Famitsu gave it a score of one eight, one seven, one eight, and one six, for a total of 29 out of 40.

Sequel 

The game was followed by a sequel released in 2005, titled WWE Day of Reckoning 2.

See also

 List of licensed wrestling video games
 List of fighting games

References

External links

2004 video games
GameCube games
GameCube-only games
Multiplayer and single-player video games
Sports video games with career mode
Take-Two Interactive franchises
THQ games
Video games developed in Japan
WWE video games
Yuke's games
Professional wrestling games